Dudley Howard Williams  (25 May 1937 – 3 November 2010) was a British biochemist known for utilizing nuclear magnetic resonance (NMR) spectroscopy and mass spectrometry in the study of molecular structure, especially the antibiotic vancomycin.

References

1937 births
2010 deaths
Academics of the University of Cambridge
Fellows of the Royal Society
British biochemists